Johan Brunström and Jean-Julien Rojer were the defending champions, but they chose to compete at Halle instead. Frederico Gil and Christophe Rochus won in the final 7–5, 7–6(3) against Santiago González and Travis Rettenmaier.

Seeds

Draw

Draw

References
 Doubles Draw

BSI Challenger Lugano - Doubles
BSI Challenger Lugano